Edward Stanton Johnson, III (born August 30, 1971) is a former American football offensive guard in the National Football League who played for the Washington Redskins and the Cleveland Browns.  He attended Peekskill High School, played college football at Temple University and was drafted in the second round of the 1994 NFL Draft. He was selected to the 1999 Pro Bowl.

He is currently a history teacher and a coach at the Landon School.

References

1971 births
Living people
American football offensive guards
Washington Redskins players
Cleveland Browns players
National Conference Pro Bowl players
Temple Owls football players
Ed Block Courage Award recipients